Steve Ixoee (born 6 June 1988) is a Caledonian footballer who plays as goalkeeper.

In the 2016 OFC Nations Cup semi-final opposing New Zealand, Ixoee inadvertently let a free kick slip past his hands into the goal; the game ended 1-0 in favor of New Zealand, who eventually won the competition.

References

1988 births
Living people
AS Magenta players
New Caledonia international footballers
New Caledonian footballers
2016 OFC Nations Cup players
Association football goalkeepers